Hla Moe Aung (born 22 December 1965) is a Burmese politician who served as Chief Minister of Ayeyarwady Region and Ayeyarwady Region Parliament MP for Myanaung Township Constituency No. 1. He was appointed as Chief Minister on January 18, 2018, after the resignation of the former chief minister Mahn Johnny. Hla Moe Aung is the vice-chair of the Township National League for Democracy. In 2021, following the 2021 Myanmar coup d'état, the State Administration Council appointed Tin Maung Win as the new Chief Minister. Hla Moe Aung was placed under house arrest.

Early life and education 
Hla Moe Aung was born on 22 December 1965 to parents Kyi Win and Htwe Yi. He attended Yezin Agricultural University in 1983 and received his B.Ag in 1991.

Political career
During the 1988 Uprising, he served as the chairman of the Thapyegone District Students' Union and joined the National League for Democracy in 1989. In the 2012 by-elections, he was the chairman of the NLD Thapyegone's Election Campaign.

In the 2015 Myanmar general election, he contested the Myanaung Township constituency No. 1 for Yangon Region Parliament  and won a seat by 37,124 votes. He also served as a secretary of the agriculture and livestock committee for the regional parliament. On 18 January 2018, became chief minister, after the resignation of the former chief minister Mahn Johnny. 

During the aftermath of the 2021 Myanmar coup d'état, Hla Moe Aung was one of many NLD MPs, ministers and speakers arrested. He was placed under house arrest in his Pathein home by the military junta. On 30 December 2022, he was released from house arrest and escorted back to Myanaung Township.

References 

Living people
National League for Democracy politicians
Prisoners and detainees of Myanmar
Government ministers of Myanmar
1965 births
Region or state chief ministers of Myanmar